Daphnella euphrosyne is a species of sea snail, a marine gastropod mollusk in the family Raphitomidae.

Description
The length of the shell attains 15 mm, its diameter 4 mm.

The white, attenuated, graceful shell contains ten whorls of which four in the protoconch. The spiral liration is distinct and regular (23 in the body whorl). The narrow aperture is oblong. The outer lip is thin. The wide siphonal canal is somewhat more prolonged. The peristome is not very effuse. There is no columellar plication.

Distribution
This marine species occurs in the Gulf of Oman.

References

External links
 

euphrosyne
Gastropods described in 1903